The Azopardo River (Spanish: Río Azopardo), is a river in Isla Grande de Tierra del Fuego, Chile at the southern tip of South America. It flows in a westerly direction and drains the waters of Fagnano Lake (also called Cami Lake) into Almirantazgo Fjord.

Is the northern limit of Yendegaia National Park.

See also
 Marinelli Creek

References 

Rivers of Chile
Rivers of Magallanes Region
Isla Grande de Tierra del Fuego